A number of film and television productions have been filmed in Martinique.

This is an incomplete list of films, TV films, soap operas, documentaries shot in Martinique, classified by commune, shooting location and broadcast date.

Location to be established 

 1971 : Troubleshooters by Georges Lautner
 1975 : Lovers Like Us by Jean-Paul Rappeneau
 1979 : Concorde Affaire '79 by Ruggero Deodato
 1989 : A Dry White Season  by Euzhan Palcy
 1992: Siméon by Euzhan Palcy
 1990 : La Fête des pères by Joy Fleury
 1994 : L'Exil du roi Behanzin by Guy Deslauriers
 1999 : The Thomas Crown Affair (1999 film) by John McTiernan
 2002 : The Truth About Charlie by Jonathan Demme
 2004 : Heading South by Laurent Cantet
 2009 : Aliker by Guy Deslauriers
 2011 : Bienvenue à bord by Éric Lavaine
 2011: Gros sur mon coeur by Chloé Glotin
 2012 : 30° Couleur by Lucien Jean-Baptiste and Philippe Larue
 2014: Chapeau Bas, Quoi! by Christophe Agelan and NENEB
 2017: BOC by NENEB
 2018: The Sea Between Us by Stephanie Saxenard
 2018: Goyave by NENEB
 2018: Neg Matinik, an pep anba dominasyon kolonial by Jahi Muntuka
 2019-2020: Your Angel: Success Story director: Khris Burton
 2022: Antan Lontan by Patrick Baucelin

B 

 Basse-Pointe :
 2012 : Toussaint Louverture (film) by Philippe Niang
 Fort-de-France :
 1983 : Sugar Cane Alley by Euzhan Palcy
 1990 : Promotion canapé by Didier Kaminka (Former spa town of Absalon)
 Le Diamant
 1994 : Television show L'Instit by Pierre Grimblat, Didier Cohen and Gérard Marx with Gérard Klein episode "Une seconde chance" (A Second Chance)
 Le François :
 1999 : Belle maman de Gabriel Aghion (Habitation Clément)
 Le Lamentin :
 1990 : Promotion canapé by Didier Kaminka
 Les Anses-d'Arlet
 1990 : Promotion canapé by Didier Kaminka
 Les Trois-Îlets :
 1983 : Sugar Cane Alley by Euzhan Palcy

R 

 Rivière-Salée :
 1983 : Sugar Cane Alley by Euzhan Palcy

S 

 Sainte-Anne :
 1990 : Promotion canapé by Didier Kaminka
 Saint-Pierre
 2004 : Biguine by Guy Deslauriers

Notes, sources et références 

 L2TC.com - Lieux de Tournage Cinématographique
 Quels films ou séries se sont tournés près de chez vous ? Cliquez sur votre région

References

Films set in Martinique
Martinique-related lists
Films shot in Martinique